Beijing No. 55 High School is a public, co-educational middle and high school in Dongcheng District, Beijing. Founded in 1975, it includes one section for local students, and a separate section for international students who study the International Baccalaureate Diploma program.

No. 55 is one of the first public schools in China to accept international students, starting in 1975. It was authorised to offer the International Baccalaureate Middle Years (MYP) program in 1995. It is administered by Principal Chen Hong, and School Party Committee Secretary Wang Ruibo.

No. 55 charges students up to ¥83,000 a year, depending on their program of choice. It does not offer financial assistance, but does award scholarships for top-scoring students of each graduating class.

Fees 
Tuition fees at No. 55 differ depending on grade levels and language of instruction. Chinese-taught programs are generally cheaper than English-taught, International Baccalaureate-approved programs. The school does not offer financial assistance, but does award scholarships for the best students of the graduating class.

Size 
Since 2011, the school was reported to have a total of 1,900 students, around 600 being international students from abroad. 

As of 2020, the school campus has expanded to encompass 44,525 square meters (11 acres) of land. The class sizes have gotten smaller despite of expansion, and the school now accepts a maximum of 300 international students.

Archeological find 
In 2015, eight sarcophagi were found buried beneath No. 55's school grounds by workers during a planned renovation and expansion of the school's land. Initially thought to be the lost tombs of the 17th Century Manchu prince and regent of the early Qing dynasty, Prince Dorgon, the school was closed by government decree for extensive archeological research. Excavation took place from November 13th 2015 to November 18th 2015. It was later confirmed by the Publicity and Education Office of the Beijing Cultural Relics Bureau that although the eight sarcophagi were Qing dynasty officials, none of them contained Prince Dorgon. The dig produced the bodies of eight buried nobles, and ten artefacts of historical significance, including copper coins, copper ornaments, and clay pots. Commenting on the conservational state of the artefacts in a statement released by the Beijing Municipal Cultural Relics Bureau, Chinese cultural preservationist Yihe Wulao classified the archaeological excavations at No. 55 as "rescue archaeology," referring to cultural relics and historic sites that can be excavated, but that have been destroyed by time and cannot be preserved.

Notable alumni 
The school has produced a number of notable figures in Chinese society. These include Chinese actor Zhang Yishan, and Chinese actress Yang Zi.

References

External links
  Beijing No. 55 High School
  Beijing No. 55 IB World School (international students section)

High schools in Beijing
Schools in Dongcheng District, Beijing
1975 establishments in China
Educational institutions established in 1975